Chemical engineering is an engineering field which deals with the study of operation and design of chemical plants as well as methods of improving production. Chemical engineers develop economical commercial processes to convert raw materials into useful products. Chemical engineering uses principles of chemistry, physics, mathematics, biology, and economics to efficiently use, produce, design, transport and transform energy and materials. The work of chemical engineers can range from the utilization of nanotechnology and nanomaterials in the laboratory to large-scale industrial processes that convert chemicals, raw materials, living cells, microorganisms, and energy into useful forms and products. Chemical engineers are involved in many aspects of plant design and operation, including safety and hazard assessments, process design and analysis, modeling, control engineering, chemical reaction engineering, nuclear engineering, biological engineering,  construction specification, and operating instructions.

Chemical engineers typically hold a degree in Chemical Engineering or Process Engineering. Practicing engineers may have professional certification and be accredited members of a professional body. Such bodies include the Institution of Chemical Engineers (IChemE) or the American Institute of Chemical Engineers (AIChE). In India the equivalent body is the Indian Institute of Chemical Engineers (IIChE) which also conducts collaborative events with AIChE and ICheE.
A degree in chemical engineering is directly linked with all of the other engineering disciplines, to various extents.

Etymology

A 1996 article cites James F. Donnelly for mentioning an 1839 reference to chemical engineering in relation to the production of sulfuric acid. In the same paper, however, George E. Davis, an English consultant, was credited with having coined the term. Davis also tried to found a Society of Chemical Engineering, but instead, it was named the Society of Chemical Industry (1881), with Davis as its first secretary. The History of Science in United States: An Encyclopedia puts the use of the term around 1890. "Chemical engineering", describing the use of mechanical equipment in the chemical industry, became common vocabulary in England after 1850. By 1910, the profession, "chemical engineer," was already in common use in Britain and the United States.

History

New concepts and innovations

In the 1940s, it became clear that unit operations alone were insufficient in developing chemical reactors. While the predominance of unit operations in chemical engineering courses in Britain and the United States continued until the 1960s, transport phenomena started to receive greater focus. Along with other novel concepts, such as process systems engineering (PSE), a "second paradigm" was defined. Transport phenomena gave an analytical approach to chemical engineering while PSE focused on its synthetic elements, such as those of a control system and process design. Developments in chemical engineering before and after World War  II were mainly incited by the petrochemical industry; however, advances in other fields were made as well. Advancements in biochemical engineering in the 1940s, for example, found application in the pharmaceutical industry, and allowed for the mass production of various antibiotics, including penicillin and streptomycin. Meanwhile, progress in polymer science in the 1950s paved way for the "age of plastics".

Safety and hazard developments
Concerns regarding large-scale chemical manufacturing facilities' safety and environmental impact were also raised during this period. Silent Spring, published in 1962, alerted its readers to the harmful effects of DDT, a potent insecticide. The 1974 Flixborough disaster in the United Kingdom resulted in 28 deaths, as well as damage to a chemical plant and three nearby villages. 1984 Bhopal disaster in India resulted in almost 4,000 deaths. These incidents, along with other incidents, affected the reputation of the trade as industrial safety and environmental protection were given more focus. In response, the IChemE required safety to be part of every degree course that it accredited after 1982. By the 1970s, legislation and monitoring agencies were instituted in various countries, such as France, Germany, and the United States.

Recent progress
Advancements in computer science found applications for designing and managing plants, simplifying calculations and drawings that previously had to be done manually. The completion of the Human Genome Project is also seen as a major development, not only advancing chemical engineering but genetic engineering and genomics as well. Chemical engineering principles were used to produce DNA sequences in large quantities.

Concepts

Chemical engineering involves the application of several principles. Key concepts are presented below.

Plant design and construction
Chemical engineering design concerns the creation of plans, specifications, and economic analyses for pilot plants, new plants, or plant modifications. Design engineers often work in a consulting role, designing plants to meet clients' needs. Design is limited by several factors, including funding, government regulations, and safety standards. These constraints dictate a plant's choice of process, materials, and equipment.

Plant construction is coordinated by project engineers and project managers, depending on the size of the investment. A chemical engineer may do the job of project engineer full-time or part of the time, which requires additional training and job skills or act as a consultant to the project group. In the USA the education of chemical engineering graduates from the Baccalaureate programs accredited by ABET do not usually stress project engineering education, which can be obtained by specialized training, as electives, or from graduate programs. Project engineering jobs are some of the largest employers for chemical engineers.

Process design and analysis

A unit operation is a physical step in an individual chemical engineering process. Unit operations (such as crystallization, filtration, drying and evaporation) are used to prepare reactants, purifying and separating its products, recycling unspent reactants, and controlling energy transfer in reactors. On the other hand, a unit process is the chemical equivalent of a unit operation. Along with unit operations, unit processes constitute a process operation. Unit processes (such as nitration, hydrogenation, and oxidation involve the conversion of materials by biochemical, thermochemical and other means. Chemical engineers responsible for these are called process engineers.

Process design requires the definition of equipment types and sizes as well as how they are connected and the materials of construction. Details are often printed on a Process Flow Diagram which is used to control the capacity and reliability of a new or existing chemical factory.

Education for chemical engineers in the first college degree 3 or 4 years of study stresses the principles and practices of process design. The same skills are used in existing chemical plants to evaluate the efficiency and make recommendations for improvements.

Transport phenomena

Modeling and analysis of transport phenomena is essential for many industrial applications. Transport phenomena involve fluid dynamics, heat transfer and mass transfer, which are governed mainly by momentum transfer, energy transfer and transport of chemical species, respectively. Models often involve separate considerations for macroscopic, microscopic and molecular level phenomena. Modeling of transport phenomena, therefore, requires an understanding of applied mathematics.

Applications and practice

Chemical engineers "develop economic ways of using materials and energy". Chemical engineers use chemistry and engineering to turn raw materials into usable products, such as medicine, petrochemicals, and plastics on a large-scale, industrial setting. They are also involved in waste management and research. Both applied and research facets could make extensive use of computers.

Chemical engineers may be involved in industry or university research where they are tasked with designing and performing experiments, by scaling up theoretical chemical reactions, to create better and safer methods for production, pollution control, and resource conservation. They may be involved in designing and constructing plants as a project engineer. Chemical engineers serving as project engineers use their knowledge in selecting optimal production methods and plant equipment to minimize costs and maximize safety and profitability. After plant construction, chemical engineering project managers may be involved in equipment upgrades, troubleshooting, and daily operations in either full-time or consulting roles.

See also

Related topics 

 Education for Chemical Engineers
 English Engineering units
 List of chemical engineering societies
 List of chemical engineers
 List of chemical process simulators
 Outline of chemical engineering

Related fields and concepts 

Biochemical engineering
Bioinformatics
Biological engineering
Biomedical engineering
Biomolecular engineering
Bioprocess engineering
Biotechnology
Biotechnology engineering
Catalysts
Ceramics
Chemical process modeling
Chemical reactor
Chemical technologist
Chemical weapons
Cheminformatics
Computational fluid dynamics
Corrosion engineering
Cost estimation
Earthquake engineering
Electrochemistry
 Electrochemical engineering
Environmental engineering
Fischer Tropsch synthesis
Fluid dynamics
Food engineering
Fuel cell
Gasification
Heat transfer
Industrial catalysts
Industrial chemistry
Industrial gas
Mass transfer
Materials science
Metallurgy
Microfluidics
Mineral processing
Molecular engineering
Nanotechnology
Natural environment
Natural gas processing
Nuclear reprocessing
Oil exploration
Oil refinery
Paper engineering
Petroleum engineering
Pharmaceutical engineering
Plastics engineering
Polymers
Process control
Process design
Process development
Process engineering
Process miniaturization
Safety engineering
Semiconductor device fabrication
Separation processes (see also: separation of mixture)
Crystallization processes
Distillation processes
Membrane processes
Syngas production
Textile engineering
Thermodynamics
Transport phenomena
Unit operations
Water technology

Associations 

American Institute of Chemical Engineers
Chemical Institute of Canada
European Federation of Chemical Engineering
Indian Institute of Chemical Engineers
Institution of Chemical Engineers
National Organization for the Professional Advancement of Black Chemists and Chemical Engineers

References

Bibliography

.
.
.
.
.
.
.
.
.
.
.
.
.
.

 
Process engineering
Engineering disciplines